The Dow Hour of Great Mysteries, was a series of seven television specials from March to November 1960, hosted by Joseph Nye Welch on NBC Television, and sponsored by Dow Chemical. Welch died on October 6, 1960, bringing the series to an end.

Episodes
Episode 1: The Bat by Mary Roberts Rinehart (31 March 1960) with Helen Hayes, Jason Robards, and Margaret Hamilton
Episode 2: The Burning Court by John Dickson Carr (24 April 1960) with George C. Scott and Barbara Bel Geddes
Episode 3: The Woman in White by Wilkie Collins (23 May 1960) with Walter Slezak, Siobhán McKenna and Lois Nettleton
Episode 4: The Datchet Diamonds by Richard Marsh (20 September 1960) with Rex Harrison and Tammy Grimes
Episode 5: The Cat and the Canary by John Willard (27 September 1960) with Andrew Duggan, Telly Savalas, and Collin Wilcox (actress)
Episode 6: The Inn of the Flying Dragon by Sheridan Le Fanu (18 October 1960) with Farley Granger, Barry Morse, and Hugh Griffith
Episode 7: The Great Impersonation by E. Philips Oppenheim (15 November 1960) with Keith Michell and Eva Gabor

References

External links
Dow Hour of Great Mysteries at IMDB
Dow Hour of Great Mysteries at CTVA
The Bat at YouTube

NBC original programming
Black-and-white American television shows
1960s American television news shows
1960 American television series debuts
1960 American television series endings